The Missouri-Pacific Depot, Ozark, now the Ozark Area Depot Museum, is a historic railroad station and museum at 1st and River Streets in Ozark, Arkansas.  It is a roughly rectangular stone structure with a hip roof, standing between River Street and the railroad tracks.  On its southern (rail-facing) side a telegrapher's booth projects.  The roof has broad eaves extending around the building, supported by large Craftsman-style knee braces, and with exposed rafters visible.  The station was built in 1910 by the Missouri-Pacific Railroad, and is notable for its association with the economically important railroad, and for its fine Craftsman architecture.  It is now a local history museum.

The building was listed on the National Register of Historic Places in 1992.

See also
National Register of Historic Places listings in Franklin County, Arkansas

References

External links
Main Street Ozark web site

Railway stations on the National Register of Historic Places in Arkansas
Railway stations in the United States opened in 1910
Museums in Franklin County, Arkansas
National Register of Historic Places in Franklin County, Arkansas
Ozark
Bungalow architecture in Arkansas
Former railway stations in Arkansas